Princess Elisabeth of Waldeck and Pyrmont (6 September 187323 November 1961) was the youngest daughter of George Victor, Prince of Waldeck and Pyrmont and wife of  Alexander, 2nd Prince of Erbach-Schönberg.

Early life

Elisabeth was born at Arolsen, Waldeck and Pyrmont the seventh child and youngest daughter of George Victor, Prince of Waldeck and Pyrmont (1831–1893), and his wife, Princess Helena of Nassau (1831–1888), daughter of William, Duke of Nassau. She was closely related to the Dutch royal family and distantly to the British Royal Family through both her parents, who are descendants of King George II of Great Britain.

She was a sister, among others, of:
Marie, Princess William of Württemberg (1857–1882), who married future William II of Württemberg.
Emma, Queen of the Netherlands (1858–1934), who married William III of the Netherlands.
Princess Helena, Duchess of Albany (1861–1922), who married Prince Leopold, Duke of Albany.
Friedrich, Prince of Waldeck and Pyrmont (1865–1946), last reigning prince of Waldeck and Pyrmont.

Marriage and family

Elisabeth married on 3 May 1900 in Arolsen, Alexander, Prince of Erbach-Schönberg (1872–1944), eldest child of Gustav, Prince of Erbach-Schönberg and Princess Marie of Battenberg.
They had four children:
Princess Imma of Erbach-Schönberg (11 May 1901 – 14 March 1947)
George Louis, Prince of Erbach-Schönberg (1 January 1903 – 27 January 1971)
Prince William of Erbach-Schönberg (4 June 1904 – 27 September 1946)
Princess Helena of Erbach-Schönberg (8 April 1907 – 16 April 1979)

As grandaunt of the bride, she was a guest at the 1937 wedding of Juliana of the Netherlands with Prince Bernhard of Lippe-Biesterfeld.

At her death, she was the last surviving child of Prince George Victor and Princess Helena.

Ancestry

Notes and sources
The Royal House of Stuart, London, 1969, 1971, 1976, Addington, A. C., Reference: 351

1873 births
1961 deaths
People from Bad Arolsen
People from the Principality of Waldeck and Pyrmont
House of Waldeck and Pyrmont
House of Erbach-Schönberg
Princesses of Waldeck and Pyrmont
Daughters of monarchs